David Morris (born January 3, 1964), known professionally as Hearty White, is a radio host and musician who is best known as the frontman for Cold Water Army, and his band Bag We Bag.  Morris, who was born in Bermuda, is also the creator of two radio personalities, Lee Harvey and Hearty White.

The Hearty White Radio Show, also known as the Miracle Nutrition Hour, aired weekly on WVFS on Tuesday nights at 9 PM EST in Tallahassee, Florida, for years.

On June 12, 2012, the "Hearty White" persona came out of retirement and resumed his show on WFMU. It is called Miracle Nutrition with Hearty White and it currently airs on Thursdays 6 to 7 PM EST.

In November 2014, Morris, in his Hearty White persona, filmed a series of station identification clips for Cartoon Network's Adult Swim adult-oriented nighttime programming block of programming.

References

1964 births
Living people
American male singer-songwriters
Florida State University alumni
Bermudian musicians
Musicians from Tallahassee, Florida
Singer-songwriters from Florida
20th-century American singers
21st-century American singers
20th-century British musicians
20th-century American male singers
21st-century American male singers